Oliver Holmes (born 7 August 1992) is an English professional rugby league footballer who  plays as a  forward for the Leigh Leopards in the Betfred Super League.

He has played at representative level for England and the England Knights. He had played his entire professional club career with Castleford, his hometown club, before one season at the Warrington Wolves in the Super League.

Background 
Holmes was born in Castleford, West Yorkshire, England.

Club career 
Holmes made his senior Castleford début against the Huddersfield Giants on 9 April 2010. Holmes scored a try in the 2014 Challenge Cup Final defeat by the Leeds Rhinos at Wembley Stadium.
Holmes played in Castleford's victory over Wakefield Trinity in August 2017, to help the club secure their first ever top-flight league title. He also played in the 2017 Super League Grand Final defeat by the Leeds Rhinos at Old Trafford.

On 17 July 2021, he played for Castleford in their 2021 Challenge Cup Final loss against St. Helens.
In June 2021, Holmes's signed a three-year contract to join the Warrington Wolves, for the  2022 season, until the end of the 2024 season.
On 11 August 2022, during a match game between Toulouse Olympique and Warrington, Holmes was assaulted by Toulouse player Corey Norman who stuck his hand in Holmes buttocks. Norman received an eight game suspension and £500 fine.
On 20 October 2022, Holmes signed a contract to join the newly promoted Leigh side.

International career
In July 2018 he was selected in the England Knights Performance squad.

Holmes made his England début on 17 October 2018 in England's 44–6 win over France at Leigh Sports Village.

In 2018 he was selected for the England Knights on their tour of Papua New Guinea. He played in the Knights' 12–16 victory at the Lae Football Stadium in Lae, and their 32–22 loss at the Oil Search National Football Stadium in Port Moresby.

References

External links 
 Castleford Tigers profile
SL profile

1992 births
Living people
Castleford Tigers players
England Knights national rugby league team players
England national rugby league team players
English rugby league players
Leigh Leopards players
Rugby league centres
Rugby league five-eighths
Rugby league locks
Rugby league players from Wakefield
Rugby league second-rows
Warrington Wolves players